Adílio Varela Sanches (born 30 December 1996) is a Portuguese footballer  who plays for SC Mirandela, as a forward.

Football career
On 28 October 2017, Varela made his professional debut with Real in a 2017–18 LigaPro match against Braga B.

References

External links

1996 births
Living people
Portuguese footballers
Association football forwards
Segunda Divisão players
Liga Portugal 2 players
G.D. Tourizense players
Real S.C. players
S.U. Sintrense players
Footballers from Lisbon